Liu Nianguang (born December 1957) is a lieutenant general (zhongjiang) in the People's Liberation Army. He was promoted to the rank of major general (shaojiang) in July 2007 and lieutenant general (zhongjiang) in July 2015. He is the current Political Commissioner of National University of Defense Technology.

Biography
Liu was born in Jingjiang, Jiangsu in December 1957. In 1974 he graduated from Jianping County No.1 High School. He enlisted in the People's Liberation Army (PLA) in December 1974. He served in the Shenyang Military Region for a long time. In 2006 he was promoted to become Director of Political Department of the 40th Group Army, a position he held until 2008. In February 2008 he became Deputy Political Commissioner of the 40th Group Army, ten months later he was promoted to become Political Commissioner. He was Director of Political Department of the Chengdu Military Region in December 2013, and held that office until January 2016. In July 2017 he was appointed Political Commissioner of National University of Defense Technology, replacing Wang Jianwei.

References

1957 births
Living people
People from Jingjiang
People's Liberation Army generals from Jiangsu